Pfeiffer House may refer to:

Pfeiffer House, Charters Towers, a heritage-listed house in Queensland, Australia
Pfeiffer House (Pfeiffer, Arkansas), listed on the NRHP in Arkansas
Pfeiffer House and Carriage House, Piggott, AR, listed on the NRHP in Arkansas
Netcott-Pfeiffer House, Parkersburg, IA, listed on the NRHP in Iowa
John Gottlieb Pfeiffer House, Faribault, MN, listed on the NRHP in Minnesota
Pfeiffer-Wheeler American Chestnut Cabin, Portville, NY, listed on the NRHP in New York